The Class 8150 is a type of 2-6-0 steam locomotive used on Japanese Government Railways. The 8150 class were among the seven hundred locomotives built by Baldwin Locomotive Works in the United States for export to Japan.

See also
 Japan Railways locomotive numbering and classification

References

2-6-0 locomotives
Steam locomotives of Japan
1067 mm gauge locomotives of Japan
Baldwin locomotives